Radha Hi Bawari is an Indian Marathi language romantic drama series which aired on Zee Marathi. It starred Shruti Marathe and Saurabh Gokhale in lead roles and Kavita Lad, Ila Bhate and Sharad Ponkshe in pivotal roles. It was premiered on 24 December 2012 and ended on 1 March 2014 completing 382 episodes. The series replaced Dilya Ghari Tu Sukhi Raha.

Summary 
Radha, an independent, self-reliant woman, is taken by surprise when she 'experiences love in its most purest and sincere form'. She is a self made gynaecologist and has a fledgling career.

Cast

Main 
 Shruti Marathe as Radha Saurabh Dharmadhikari
 Saurabh Gokhale as Saurabh Madhukar Dharmadhikari

Recurring 
 Kavita Lad as Seema Madhukar Dharmadhikari
 Sharad Ponkshe as Madhukar Dharmadhikari
 Ila Bhate as Sai Pradhan, Radha's guardian
 Amol Bawdekar as Kedar Madhukar Dharmadhikari
 Tushar Dalvi as Markand Madhukar Dharmadhikari
 Sunil Barve as Gautam Shrungarpure
 Ashwini Ekbote as Sarita Manohar
 Adwait Dadarkar as Victor D'costa
 Mrunal Jadhav as Jui D'costa, Victor's daughter

Awards

References

External links 
 
 
 Radha Hi Bawari at ZEE5

Marathi-language television shows
Zee Marathi original programming
2012 Indian television series debuts
2014 Indian television series endings